Red Rock Outlaw is a 1949 American musical Western film directed by Elmer Clifton.

Cast
Bob Gilbert as Terry Larson / Jeff Larson
Ione Nixon as Carolina
Lee 'Lasses' White as 'Lasses' White
Forrest Matthews as Jim Martin
Billy Dix as Sheriff
Reno Browne as Reno - troupe driver manager
Wanda Cantlon as Daisy Nell - singer / dancer
Tennessee Jim as Tennessee Jim
Ginny Jackson as troupe member
Joyce Gardner as troupe member
Pinksy Patek as troupe member
Johnny Bias as gambler
Ewing Miles Brown as gambler 
Clint Johnson as The Parson
Eddie Majors as gambler
Billy McCoy as deputy
Whitey Hughes as Henchman

References

External links

1949 Western (genre) films
American Western (genre) films
Films directed by Elmer Clifton
American black-and-white films
Astor Pictures films
1940s English-language films
1940s American films